, there were about 41,000 electric vehicles in Maryland.

In 2022, Maryland was ranked by LendingTree as the third-best state in the United States for electric vehicle ownership.

Government policy
From 2014 to 2017, electric vehicles were eligible to use high-occupancy vehicle lanes in Maryland.

The state government initially offered a $2,000 tax rebate for electric vehicle purchases; however, this rebate expired in July 2020. In July 2023, the state government will start offering a $3,000 tax credit for electric vehicles, and $2,000 for plug-in hybrid vehicles.

, the state government's official policy goal is to have 300,000 electric vehicles in the state by 2025.

, the state government is required by law to transition all cars in the state fleet to electric by 2031, and remaining light-duty vehicles by 2036.

Charging stations
, there were about 1,000 charging stations in Maryland.

The Infrastructure Investment and Jobs Act, signed into law in November 2021, allocates  to charging stations in Maryland.

, the state government offers tax rebates of $700 for installation of home charging stations.

By region

Baltimore
In October 2021, Baltimore County announced plans to replace 10% of its fleet with electric vehicles by 2030.

There have been concerns about racial inequality with regards to the prevalence of charging stations in Baltimore.

Washington metropolitan area

, there were about 13,000 electric vehicles registered in Montgomery County. , there were 214 charging stations in Montgomery County.

References

Road transportation in Maryland
Maryland